Abdominal thrusts, also known as the Heimlich maneuver or Heimlich manoeuvre, is a first aid procedure used to treat upper airway obstructions (or choking) by foreign objects. American doctor Henry Heimlich is often credited for its creation. Performing abdominal thrusts involves a rescuer standing behind a patient and using their hands to exert pressure on the bottom of the diaphragm. This compresses the lungs and exerts pressure on any object lodged in the trachea, hopefully expelling it.

Most modern protocols, including those of the American Heart Association, American Red Cross and the European Resuscitation Council, recommend several stages for airway obstructions, designed to apply increasingly more pressure. Most protocols recommend encouraging the victim to cough, followed by hard back slaps, and finally abdominal thrusts or chest thrusts as a last resort. Some guidelines also recommend alternating between abdominal thrusts and back slaps.

History 
Thoracic surgeon and medical researcher Henry Heimlich, noted for promulgating abdominal thrusts, claimed that back slaps were proven to cause death by lodging foreign objects into the windpipe. The 1982 Yale study by Day, DuBois, and Crelin that persuaded the American Heart Association to stop recommending back blows for dealing with choking was partially funded by Heimlich's own foundation. According to Roger White MD of the Mayo Clinic and American Heart Association (AHA), "There was never any science here. Heimlich overpowered science all along the way with his slick tactics and intimidation, and everyone, including us at the AHA, caved in."

From 1985 to 2005, abdominal thrusts were the only recommended treatment for choking in the published guidelines of the American Heart Association and the American Red Cross. In 2006, both organizations drastically changed course and "downgraded" the use of the technique. For conscious victims, the new guidelines recommend first applying back slaps; if this method failed to remove the airway obstruction, rescuers were to then apply abdominal thrusts. For unconscious victims, the new guidelines recommend chest thrusts.

Henry Heimlich also promoted abdominal thrusts as a treatment for drowning and asthma attacks. The Red Cross now contests those claims. The Heimlich Institute has stopped advocating on their website for the Heimlich maneuver to be used as a first aid measure for drowning victims. His son, Peter M. Heimlich, alleges that in August 1974 his father published the first of a series of fraudulent case reports in order to promote the use of abdominal thrusts for near-drowning rescue. The 2005 drowning rescue guidelines of the American Heart Association did not include citations of Heimlich's work, and warned against the use of the Heimlich maneuver for drowning rescue as unproven and dangerous, due to its risk of vomiting leading to aspiration.

In May 2016, Henry Heimlich, aged 96, claimed to have personally used the maneuver to save the life of a fellow resident at his retirement home in Cincinnati. It was alleged to be either the first or second time Heimlich himself used his namesake maneuver to save the life of someone in a non-simulated choking situation. According to Heimlich's son, Peter M. Heimlich, "both 'rescues' were bogus."

Universal sign of choking
A choking victim is usually unable to speak, and may not be able to make much sound at all. A universal sign of choking has been designated as a silent indication from a person who is unable to breathe, and consists of placing both hands on one's own throat while trying to attract the attention of others who might assist.

Technique 
Both the American Red Cross and UK National Health Service (NHS) advise that, as a first resort, a rescuer should encourage the patient to cough out the obstruction. As a second resort, the rescuer should give five slaps on the back, after bending the patient forward. Abdominal thrusts are recommended only if these methods fail.

As with the European Resuscitation Council and the Mayo Clinic, they recommend a repeating cycle of 5 back slaps and 5 abdominal thrusts. They are not recommended on babies below the age of 1. In contrast to the prevailing American and European advice, the Australian Resuscitation Council recommends chest thrusts instead of abdominal thrusts.

Performing abdominal thrusts involves a rescuer standing behind an upright patient, and using their hands to exert forceful pressures on the bottom of the diaphragm. As an example, WebMD recommends making a fist with one hand grasping it with the other, to press with both just above the person's bellybutton. This compresses the lungs and exerts pressure on any object lodged in the trachea, hopefully expelling it. The pressure amounts to an artificially induced cough. To assist a larger person, more force may be needed. The Mayo Clinic recommends the same placement of fist and hand and upward thrusts as if you are trying to lift the person.

If the victim can not receive pressures on the abdomen (for example, in case of pregnancy or excessive obesity), chest thrusts are advised instead. These are applied on the lower half of the chest bone, but not in the very endpoint (which is the xiphoid process and could be broken).

If the victim is not upright, the US National Institutes of Health (NIH) recommends positioning the person on their back, then straddling the torso and using chest thrusts.

It is possible for still-conscious choking victims to perform the procedure on themselves, without assistance. However, this can be difficult, so, in this cases and some others (disabled people, etc.), the use of an anti-choking device is recommended.

Due to the forceful nature of the procedure, even when done correctly, abdominal thrusts can injure the person on whom it is performed. Bruising to the abdomen is highly likely and more serious injuries can occur, including fracture of the xiphoid process or ribs. The NHS recommend that anyone who has been subjected to abdominal thrusts should seek a medical examination afterwards.

Researchers at Royal Brompton Hospital have demonstrated that similar intrathoracic pressures (50–60 cmH2O) are produced by a first aider performing abdominal thrusts inwards as are produced when the force is directed inwards and upwards. They argue that this may be easier to perform with less concern about injury to ribcage or upper abdominal organs. Self-administered abdominal thrusts by study participants produced similar pressures to those generated by first aiders. The highest pressures were produced by participants performing an abdominal thrust onto the back of a chair (115 cmH2O).

See also
Henry Heimlich
First-Aid treatment of choking
Basic airway management
 Basic life support

References

External links 

The Heimlich Institute promotes various methods of dealing with obstructed breathing
Articles and information about Dr. Heimlich's use of fraudulent case reports to promote the Heimlich maneuver for drowning rescue and asthma. Dr. Heimlich died in Cincinnati, Ohio, USA, December 17, 2016

Survival skills
First aid